Pia Liisa Kauma (born 20 October 1966 in Joensuu) is a Finnish politician who serves as a Member of the Finnish parliament and as a member of the City Council of Espoo, representing the National Coalition Party. Kauma is also a member of the Finnish delegation of the Parliamentary Assembly of the Organization for Security and Co-operation in Europe and serves as the Vice-Chairman of the organization.

Political career

Kauma was a member of the Finnish Parliament between 2011 and 2015, and was re-elected in 2017. With an education in economics and business, she has served in the Parliament on the Commerce Committee, the Social Affairs and Health Committee, the Grand Committee, the Constitutional Law Committee, and the Environment Committee. 

In addition to her Vice-Presidency of the OSCE PA, Kauma was a member of the Finnish OSCE PA delegation between 2011 and 2015 and an alternate member between 2017 and 2019, and has been a member since 2019. She served as the rapporteur of the General Committee on Political Affairs and Security between 2013 and 2014, and has participated in numerous election observation missions.

Kauma was appointed as Special Representative on Central Asia Engagement in August 2021 and previously served as Special Representative on Civil Society Engagement.

Kauma also serves as the Chairman of parliamentary friendship groups of the Finnish parliament for Spain and France.

Other activities
Kauma is a member of the Stakeholder Advisory Board of Fortum, the Representative Council of HOK-Elanto and the Management Board of Fennia group.

Personal life
Kauma is married to Jussi Kauma, with whom she has four children.

References

1966 births
Living people
People from Joensuu
National Coalition Party politicians
Members of the Parliament of Finland (2011–15)
Members of the Parliament of Finland (2015–19)
Members of the Parliament of Finland (2019–23)
21st-century Finnish women politicians
Finnish city councillors
Women local politicians